"Experiment IV" is a song by the English singer Kate Bush. It was released as a single on 27 October 1986, in order to promote Bush's greatest hits album The Whole Story. The single peaked at 23 in the UK Singles Chart, simultaneously with "Don't Give Up", Bush's duet with Peter Gabriel, which reached number 9.

Overview 
The song tells a story about a secret military plan to create a sound that is horrific enough to kill people. The ending of the story is unclear, but in the music video nearly every person working on the project is killed by the horrific sound, which is personified by Bush herself as she changed from an angelic apparition into an horrific flying monster.

The song features Nigel Kennedy on violin, who at one point replicates the screeching violins from Bernard Herrmann's famous scoring of the shower scene in Alfred Hitchcock's 1960 film Psycho.

The B-sides of both the 7" and 12" singles included a re-working of "Wuthering Heights", the single which catapulted her to stardom in 1978. On the 12" single, the 1980 song "December Will Be Magic Again" was included as an additional B-side.

An extended version of "Experiment IV" appeared on the 12" vinyl release of the single. Both versions of the song were included on the second CD, second cassette or second LP of rarities on the box set This Woman's Work, released in 1990. A slightly longer version, known as the 'Video Mix' appears on 2019's The Other Sides.

Music video
The music video for the song adapts the "storyline", and chronicles the destruction of a secret military installation by a creature made of sound. The science fiction film-in-miniature includes appearances from Dawn French, Hugh Laurie, Richard Vernon, Peter Vaughan, Paddy Bush and Del Palmer. Bush appears on screen as an orderly officer serving tea, as the sound creature and at the end entering a van. The video was banned from Top of the Pops because it was considered "too violent" for a pre-watershed slot.  In the UK, the music video was shown at some cinemas as an accompaniment to the main feature.

The music video, directed by Bush herself, was nominated for the Best Concept Music Video at the 1988 Grammy Awards.

Track listing
All songs were written by Kate Bush.

7" single (UK)

12" single (UK)

Chart performance

In Australia, "Experiment IV" narrowly missed the Kent Music Report top 100 singles chart in December 1986.

Further reading
An article about the video for Experiment IV and its horror influences

References

Kate Bush songs
1986 singles
Songs written by Kate Bush
1986 songs